Serhiy Dymchenko (born 23 August 1967) is a retired Ukrainian high jumper. His personal best jump is 2.37 metres, achieved in September 1990 in Kyiv.

Achievements

External links

1967 births
Living people
Ukrainian male high jumpers
Athletes (track and field) at the 2000 Summer Olympics
Olympic athletes of Ukraine